Nogometni klub Elkroj Mozirje, commonly referred to as NK Elkroj or simply Elkroj, was a Slovenian football club from Mozirje, which played in the Slovenian Republic League.

Association football clubs established in 1975
Defunct football clubs in Slovenia
1975 establishments in Slovenia